Saint Gerosa High School is a Catholic girls school in Mangalore city of Karnataka state in India. It is situated in the Jeppu locality of Mangalore. This school is managed by the Sisters of Charity.

History 
This school was opened in 1964 when 84 students were enrolled for 8th standard in Kannada medium, and in subsequent years for 9th and 10th standard students. The first batch of SSLC students appeared for the public examination in March 1967. In the year 1972, the first batch of English medium girls who had passed their 7th Std.  District level Examination, enrolled themselves in the High School, adding a parallel English medium section to the existing aided Kannada medium High School.

References

External link
 

High schools and secondary schools in Karnataka
Christian schools in Karnataka
Schools in Mangalore
Schools in Dakshina Kannada district
Catholic secondary schools in India
Educational institutions established in 1964
1964 establishments in Mysore State